Tango from Obango is the debut album by European jazz group the Vienna Art Orchestra (credited as Wiener Art Orchester) which was first released in 1980 on the Art label. The album was re-released on CD in 1997 with additional material along with a sampler disc.

Reception

The Allmusic review by Tom Schulte called it "an important document in the post-modern jazz movement".

Track listing
All compositions by Mathias Rüegg
 "Tango from Obango" – 13:24	
 "Polish Contrasts" – 9:36
 "Voilà di Here" – 1:15
 "The World of Beband & Bigbop" – 12:42
 "Panta Rhei" – 5:53
 "Charly's Trauma" – 0:38
 "Aftercare by Wolfgang Puschnig" – 3:53 Additional track on CD reissue

Two Songs for a Lovely War Additional disc on 1997 CD reissue 
 "Song for Another Lovely War" – 15:59 recorded in 1988
 "Another Song for Another Lovely War" – 14:39 recorded in 1988
 "Jessas Na!" – 3:42 recorded in 1977 and originally released on 7 inch single
 "Kontrapunkte" – 4:49 recorded in 1977 and originally released on 7 inch single

Personnel
Mathias Rüegg - arranger, conductor 
Lauren Newton - voice
Karl Fian - trumpet
Herbert Joos − flugelhorn, baritone horn
Christian Radovan − trombone
Wolfgang Puschnig − alto saxophone, flute
Harry Sokal - tenor saxophone, soprano saxophone, flute
Roman Schwaller − tenor saxophone
Uli Scherer − piano
Harry Pepl – guitar (track 4)
Jürgen Wuchner	− bass
Werner Pirchner − marimba, vibraphone
Fritz Ozmec − drums
Wolfgang Reisinger − percussion

References

1980 albums
Vienna Art Orchestra albums